Željava is a village in the Plitvička Jezera municipality, Lika-Senj County, Croatia. It is located between Ličko Petrovo Selo and the border with Bosnia and Herzegovina.

Demographics

NOTE: The 1869 population data is included in the Ličko Petrovo Selo population figure

Sights
 Željava Air Base

References

Populated places in Lika-Senj County